The Biemann Medal is awarded annually by the American Society for Mass Spectrometry (ASMS) to an individual early in his or her career in recognition of significant achievement in basic or applied mass spectrometry. It is named after professor Klaus Biemann.

Nominees must be within the first 15 years of receiving the Ph.D. in the year nomination is considered (exceptions may be considered). Eligibility is not restricted to members of ASMS.

The award is conferred at the ASMS Annual Conference with the presentation of a $5,000 cash award, the Biemann Medal, and the award lecture.

Recipients 

 1997 – Scott A. McLuckey
 1998 – Robert R. Squires
 1999 – Matthias Mann
 2000 – Julie A. Leary
 2001 – Peter B. Armentrout
 2002 – Ruedi Aebersold
 2003 – Carol V. Robinson
 2004 – John R. Yates
 2005 – Gary J. Van Berkel
 2006 – David E. Clemmer
 2007 – Roman A. Zubarev
 2008 – Julia Laskin
 2009 – Neil L. Kelleher
 2010 – David C. Muddiman
 2011 – Bela Paizs
 2012 – Joshua J. Coon
 2013 – Yinsheng Wang
 2014 – Lingjun Li
 2015 – Michael MacCoss
 2016 – Kristina Håkansson
 2017 – Ryan Julian
 2018 - Benjamin A. Garcia
 2019 – Sarah Trimpin
 2020 – Ying Ge
 2021 – Nuno Bandeira
 2022 – Erin S. Baker

See also

 List of chemistry awards
 List of female mass spectrometrists

References

External links

Academic awards
Mass spectrometry awards